The Rhodes Professorship of Imperial History was one of the senior professorships in history at King's College London. Endowed by the Rhodes Trust in 1919, it was axed in 2022 over links to the colonial legacy of its namesake Cecil Rhodes. It was the second oldest academic chair in its subject in the world after the  Beit Professorship of Colonial History at  Oxford (founded in 1905).

List of holders
 Arthur Percival Newton (1920–1938)
 Vincent T. Harlow (1938–1949)
 Gerald S. Graham (1949–1970)
 Peter James Marshall (1980–1993)
 Andrew Porter (1993–2008)
 Richard Drayton (2009–2022)

References

Imperial History, Rhodes
Imperial History, Rhodes